Chrysopeleia is a genus of moths in the family Cosmopterigidae. The genus was erected by Vactor Tousey Chambers in 1874.

Species
Chrysopeleia metacirrha (Meyrick, 1921)
Chrysopeleia purpuriella Chambers, 1874
Chrysopeleia quadricristatela Chambers, 1880

References

Chrysopeleiinae